NeosVR is a free-to-play, massively multiplayer online, virtual reality application created by Solirax. It was released for free on Microsoft Windows via Steam on May 4, 2018, with support for several VR headsets.

The game allows users to interact with one another as avatars and features development tools for players to create in-game elements such as games and maps.

Gameplay 
The gameplay of NeosVR bears similarities to that of VRChat and AltspaceVR. Players interact with each other through virtual 2D and 3D avatars capable of lip sync, eye tracking, blinking, and a complete range of motion. While the game is titled "NeosVR", the player does not need VR equipment to play the game and may play in a desktop configuration. In this form, there are certain inabilities such as freely moving an avatar's limbs and the inability to use some two-handed VR items.

Users may import and create avatars from other games using NeosVR's built-in "avatar creator". In addition to avatars, users can write computer programs using Logix, a node-based programming system implemented entirely within NeosVR. Logix may be used to drive functionality for avatars, worlds and other inventions.

NeosVR's selection of worlds includes minigames, social lounges, and worlds created by the user base. A single user may have several multiplayer worlds loaded at the same time, utilizing NeosVR's FrooxEngine to use multiple worlds at once. Users can customize their own worlds entirely from within NeosVR without the use of external SDKs, though it is possible to upload custom content such as code and in-game items for use.

In the beginning of 2022, NeosVR held an event called "MMC 2023", which showcased the platform's collaborative capabilities in a 3D virtual space. Participants were able to work on projects and exchange feedback, while also forming connections with other users. The event highlighted the potential for collaboration and community building within the metaverse.

Hardware and software support 
NeosVR supports many VR headsets such as Oculus Rift, Oculus Rift S, Oculus Quest with Oculus Link, Oculus Go, Pimax headsets, HTC Vive, Valve Index, and the Windows Mixed Reality headsets. Controllers with finger presence detection, like the Valve Index, enable users to perform hand and finger movements that can be used to trigger specific facial expressions, animations, or customized events.

In addition to numerous headsets, NeosVR supports a wide variety of VR accessories such as the Leap Motion finger-tracking module and the HTC Vive Facial Tracker, enabling a user to visibly broadcast lower facial expressions and speech. The HTC Vive Pro Eye is also supported, enabling the use of eye presence in select avatars.

NeosVR also offers support for hip and feet tracking, also known as 'full-body' tracking. Through inverse kinematics, the system calculates movement using up to eight extra trackers to replicate a person's physical movements in real-time.

See also 
 AltspaceVR  a Microsoft-based virtual reality social platform
 VRChat  similar virtual reality game
 Sansar  social virtual reality platform developed by the Second Life team

References

External links 
 Official website

2018 video games
Massively multiplayer online games
Virtual reality communities
Virtual reality games
Windows games
HTC Vive games
Oculus Rift games
Meta Quest games